Flower Hill is a village in Nassau County, on the North Shore of Long Island, in New York, United States. The eastern half is considered part of the Greater Roslyn area, which is anchored by the Incorporated Village of Roslyn. Western and northern parts are more closely associated with Manhasset and Port Washington. The population was 4,794 at the 2020 census.

The Incorporated Village of Flower Hill is located entirely within the Town of North Hempstead, and has been recognized as a Tree City USA since 2013.

History

Before the village (pre-colonization – 1930) 
The area where Flower Hill is located was originally inhabited by Algonquin Native Americans. In the 17th century, European colonists started to settle in the area, specifically settlers of Dutch and English heritage.

This era saw members of prominent colonial families settled in the area, including members of the Hewlett family (the same family after whom Hewlett, New York is named, as well as Hewlett Lane in Flower Hill). Members of the family settled in the area during this time, and constructed the former Hewlett Homestead circa 1713.

During this time, the area consisted of many farms, and was in an ideal location for them, as the goods produced in the area would be brought down to either Manhasset Bay in Manhasset or Port Washington, or to Hempstead Harbor in Roslyn for shipment to destinations in New York City and beyond.

At this time, the heart of Flower Hill was located where modern-day Port Washington Boulevard, Bonnie Heights Road, and Country Club Drive intersect. This area included a blacksmith, general store, tavern, a village well, and a cemetery, in addition to a small number of homes.

Circa 1900, Carlos Munson – the heir to the Munson Steamship Company – and his wife, Mabel, settled in Flower Hill. Carlos and Mabel Munson were unhappy to be living near so many intoxicated locals found in this area, which prompted Mabel asking Carlos to do something to get rid of them. Carlos responded by purchasing the land, despite having no need for it. To further eliminate this issue, the Munsons gave some of this land to the Franciscan Missionaries of Mary.

In the early decades of the 20th century, the New York & North Shore Traction Company operated a trolley line connecting Mineola, Roslyn, and Port Washington – as well as one connecting Flushing and Roslyn – through the village, utilizing Northern Boulevard, Middle Neck Road, and Port Washington Boulevard.

The two lines intersected at a junction located at the intersection of Middle Neck Road and Northern Boulevard. This was also the site of the company's former Roslyn trolley yard and a substation; it was located at the northwestern corner of the intersection.

Additionally, a trolley siding existed in Flower Hill on the east side of Port Washington Boulevard, near its intersection with modern-day Farmview Road.

Push for incorporation (1930 – 1931) 
The push for Flower Hill's incorporation first started in 1930, when word was spread that Port Washington was planning to incorporate itself as a city. Upon hearing these rumors, residents of Flower Hill feared that the Flower Hill area would be placed within the boundaries of the proposed City of Greater Port Washington if those plans were ultimately to be approved. As a result, the residents of Flower Hill saw a need to incorporate the locality as a village, in order to prevent the area from becoming part of the rumored city.

After two unsuccessful attempts to hold a hearing on Flower Hill's incorporation as a village, residents tried for a third time in April 1931, and were successful. With the approval of the application for a hearing, a vote to decide whether or not Flower Hill should incorporate itself was set for April 27 of that year; the vote would be held in Carlos Munson's real estate office.

During the vote on April 27, the residents of Flower Hill voted unanimously in favor of incorporating Flower Hill as a village, and the Incorporated Village of Flower Hill was ultimately born.

Village of Flower Hill (1931 – present) 
In May 1931, a few weeks after the birth of the village, its certificate of incorporation was signed. Carlos Munson was originally selected to serve as its first Mayor but turned down the position, which was subsequently given to Arthur G. Elvin. When founded, the population of Flower Hill was 288. The first village meeting took place in Carlos Munson's real estate office; Village Hall now occupies this parcel of land.

In the mid-1930s, the Franciscan Missionaries of Mary would establish St. Francis Hospital as a cardiac sanatorium for children, on the land given to them by Carlos Munson. The first children arrived at this facility on February 8, 1937.

Flower Hill started to see new housing developments be built in the coming years. One of the notable developments built during this time is a large part of the Flower Hill Estates subdivision, which was built by Walter Uhl. Uhl began to build many of these first homes in the vicinity of Country Club Drive, located in the Port Washington section of the village, and adjacent to the North Hempstead Country Club. Uhl built many of these homes in the colonial style, to ensure that they would fit in with existing buildings and surroundings. Some of these homes were also built with reused wood from barns in their ceilings. During the subdivision's construction process in 1939, an old Spanish "piece-of-eight" was unearthed by a construction worker. The coin, dating back to 1793, was presented by Uhl to the Port Washington Library.

In the years and decades following the Second World War, Flower Hill continued to be suburbanized, and many new developments were built as a result. Many of these new developments were built over former estates (such as the Chanticlare at Flower Hill subdivision, which was built over the former estate of Jesse Ricks), farms (such as the Hewlett Farm subdivision, which was built over portions of the former Hewlett Homestead), and even former sand mines (such as certain parts of the Wildwood at Flower Hill development, built on land once owned by the Colonial Sand & Stone Company). A notable housing development built during this time is Flower Hill Country Estates, which was developed by Country Estates, Incorporated. The firm also built the Country Estates subdivision of nearby East Hills around the same time, over Clarence Mackay's former estate.

In 1946, Marjorie Church Logan (wife of William John Logan) was murdered in her home on Bonnie Heights Road, and her daughter, Marjory Jeanne, was shot and raped. The suspect, Ward Beecher Caraway, was a butler and chauffeur at another estate in Flower Hill, and was ultimately sentenced to death for the crimes.

In 1948, Flower Hill Village Hall was built. It was designed by Roslyn-based architect Henry W. Johanson, and is located where Carlos Munson's real estate office had previously stood.

The construction of so many new subdivisions and homes in the village and the subsequent influx of children prompted the Roslyn Union Free School District to construct the Roslyn–Flower Hill Elementary School (as well as several other new schools) to better serve the needs of the section of area of Flower Hill zoned for Roslyn's schools, as well as to resolve overcrowding at the district's other schools. Built and opened in the early 1950s and sandwiched between the Wildwood and Broadridge subdivisions, the Roslyn–Flower Hill Elementary School served the community until September 1980, when it was closed due to the declining enrollment numbers following the baby-boom era. The former school's property was later subdivided to become the Mashady Estates subdivision in the 1980s, and now consists of multiple single-family homes; it was developed by the N & H Development Corporation.
Between 2012 and 2016, Elaine Phillips served as the Mayor of Flower Hill. She served in this capacity until being elected to the New York State Senate in November 2016. The Phillips Administration oversaw the rehabilitation and modernization of the village-owned Flower Hill Park, which included the installation of a state-of-the-art playground for children.

On October 29, 2012, Superstorm Sandy made landfall, and caused widespread damage throughout the New York metropolitan area. The entirety of the Village of Flower Hill lost power as a result of this storm. Due to communication errors from the Long Island Power Authority, some residents were without power for two unusually cold weeks. Village officials kept Village Hall open despite the fact that telephone lines and the heating system were initially down. Village officials also as regularly reached out to LIPA and local residents, and assisted in removing downed trees. Some officials even checked in on every senior living alone in the village, also offering them free transportation to and from shelters and ensuring that they were stocked with food. When the generators for Village Hall started to run, village officials started offering residents with heat, power, and even coffee at the building. There were no storm-related fatalities in Flower Hill, and only one home was lost within the village, when its generator caught fire.

In response to all of the trees lost in Flower Hill due to Hurricane Sandy, the village created a tree planting program, through which residents can receive a free tree for their property, given that the tree is planted in the village's right-of-way. This program helped the village become recognized as a Tree City USA.

Robert McNamara became Mayor in 2016, succeeding Senator Phillips. A notable accomplishment of the McNamara Administration was the initiation of the process of village's takeover of Middle Neck Road (former CR D55) – which connects Northern and Port Washington Boulevards – from Nassau County, which had been a goal of the village's for several years, given the poor upkeep from the Nassau County Department of Public Works. In the deal, the Nassau County would repair the road and repave the road, and would then sell it to the Village of Flower Hill for $1. In the past, the Village of Flower Hill also purchased the Flower Hill Park and the Flower Hill section of Stonytown Road from Nassau County.

McNamara's administration also implemented a construction impact fee for large construction projects.

Mayor McNamara, who long-suffered from health complications, died on April 15, 2020. Deputy Mayor Brian Herrington assumed the duties of Mayor, in light of McNamara's passing.

On August 4, 2020, Hurricane Isaias struck the New York metropolitan area as a strong tropical storm, causing widespread power outages and damage across the region. Many trees in Flower Hill were uprooted, and much of the village lost power. Due to communication errors from PSEG Long Island, many delays took place in restoring power to the entirety of the village, resulting in some residents being without power for more than a week. Village officials designated Village Hall as a cooling center and phone charging center for residents that were without power, following COVID-19 social distancing guidelines.The 2020 mayoral election was supposed to take place on March 18, 2020 – but was postponed first until April 28 and then again until September, due to an order signed by Governor Andrew M. Cuomo as a result of COVID-19. The election ultimately took place on Tuesday, September 15, 2020. The election, which was highly contested, saw then-Trustee Kate Hirsch challenging incumbent Mayor Brian Herrington. Herrington was ultimately re-elected by Flower Hill voters to serve a full term, defeating Hirsch; Herrington received 596 votes, and Hirsch received 233.

On February 23, 2021, the Arbor Day Foundation designated Flower Hill as a Tree City USA for the seventh consecutive year.

In early 2022, ownership of Middle Neck Road was officially transferred to the Village from Nassau County.

Geography 

Additionally, Flower Hill is located on the southern portion of the Cow Neck Peninsula.

Topography 
Like the rest of Long Island's North Shore, Flower Hill is situated on a terminal moraine, which is named the Harbor Hill Moraine. This moraine was formed by glaciers during the Wisconsin Glacial Episode, and is named for Harbor Hill in Roslyn; Harbor Hill is the highest geographic point in Nassau County.

Some of the hills in Flower Hill reach elevations high enough that on a clear day, the skyline of New York City can easily be seen from the ground – notably in the Manhasset portion of the village.

The lowest point is Hempstead Harbor, which is at sea level. Both the highest and lowest points in Flower Hill are within the portion of the village served by the Roslyn Post Office.

Drainage 

Flower Hill is split among three minor drainage areas: Inner Hempstead Harbor (part of the Hempstead Harbor Watershed), Leeds Pond, and Whitney Pond (both of which are part of the Manhasset Bay Watershed). 

Furthermore, the village, as a whole, is located within the larger Long Island Sound/Atlantic Ocean Watershed.

Climate 
The Village of Flower Hill features a humid subtropical climate (Cfa) under the Köppen climate classification and is located near the transitional zone between humid subtropical and humid continental (Dfa) climates. As such, the village experiences hot, humid summers and cold winters, and experiences precipitation throughout the entirety of the year.

Plant zone 
According to the United States Department of Agriculture (USDA), Flower Hill is located in the transition zone between hardiness zones 7a and 7b.

Demographics

2020 census 
As of the 2020 United States Census, there were 4,794 people and 1,515 households in Flower Hill. The racial makeup of the village was 72.86% White (71.40% non-Hispanic), 0.71% African American, 0.20% Native American, 18.86% Asian, 2.00% from other races, and 5.36% from two or more races. Hispanic or Latino of any race were 5.84% of the population.

The age distribution was 5.1% under the age of 5, 29.5% under the age of 18, 70.5% over the age of 18, and 15.4% 65 or older. The median age was 43.3 years.

The median household income was $234,702. About 3.1% of the population was below the poverty line, including 0.6% of those under age 18 and 16.8% of those age 65 or over.

Additionally, 4.2% of Flower Hill residents were veterans of the armed forces.

2010 census 
As of the 2010 United States Census, there were 4,665 people, 1,444 households, and 1,322 families in Flower Hill, and there were 1,597 housing units. The racial makeup of the village was 80.8% White, 5.1% African American, 0.0% Native American, 13.7% Asian, 0.0% from other races, and 0.3% from two or more races. Hispanic or Latino of any race were 3.7% of the population.

Of the 1,444 households, 52.1% had children under the age of 18 living with them, 85.4% were married couples living together, 5.5% had a female householder with no husband present, 0.7% had a female householder with no husband present, and 8.4% were non-families. 7.5% of households were one person, and 3.9% were one person aged 65 or older. The average household size was 3.19 and the average family size was 3.35.

The median age was 41.5 years. For every 100 females, there were 105.2 males.

The median household income was $195,833 and the median family income was $202,895. Males had a median income of $160,242 versus $67,188 for females. About 1.7% of families were below the poverty line.

Census 2000 
As of the 2000 United States Census, there were 4,508 people, 1,477 households, and 1,271 families in Flower Hill. The population density was 2,790.2 people per square mile (1,074.4/km2). There were 1,514 housing units at an average density of 937.1 per square mile (360.8/km2). The racial makeup of the village was 85.65% White, 1.04% African American, 0.02% Native American, 10.31% Asian, 0.98% from other races, and 2.00% from two or more races. Hispanic or Latino of any race were 4.02% of the population.

Of the 1,477 households, 39.3% had children under the age of 18 living with them, 78.1% were married couples living together, 5.9% had a female householder with no husband present, and 13.9% were non-families. 11.8% of households were one person, and 6.9% were one person aged 65 or older. The average household size was 3.03 and the average family size was 3.29.

The age distribution was 26.1% under the age of 18, 5.8% from 18 to 24, 22.8% from 25 to 44, 29.0% from 45 to 64, and 16.3% 65 or older. The median age was 42 years. For every 100 females, there were 94.9 males. For every 100 females age 18 and over, there were 91.2 males.

The median household income was $121,999 and the median family income was $133,075. Males had a median income of $100,000 versus $49,688 for females. The per capita income for the village was $64,997. About 2.0% of families and 2.9% of the population were below the poverty line, including 1.7% of those under age 18 and 3.5% of those age 65 or over.

Government

Village government 
As of January 2023, the Mayor of Flower Hill is Randall Rosenbaum, the Deputy Mayor is Brian Herrington, and the Village Trustees are Mary Jo Collins, Claire Dorfman, Max Frankel, Frank Genese, Brian Herrington, and Gary Lewandowski. All elected officials on the Board of Trustees serve 2-year terms and are unpaid.

The following is a list of Flower Hill's mayors, from 1931 to present:

Representation in higher government

Town representation 
Flower Hill is located entirely within the Town of North Hempstead's 6th council district, which as of January 2023 is represented on the North Hempstead Town Council by Mariann Dalimonte (D–Port Washington).

County representation 

Flower Hill is split between the Nassau County Legislature's 9th and 11th Legislative districts, which as of January 2023 are represented by Richard Nicoello (R–New Hyde Park) and Delia DiRiggi-Whitton (D–Glen Cove), respectively.

State representation

New York State Senate 
Flower Hill is located entirely within New York's 7th State Senate district, which as of January 2023 is represented by Jack M. Martins (R–Old Westbury).

New York State Assembly 
Flower Hill is located within New York's 16th State Assembly district, which as of January 2023 is represented by Gina L. Sillitti (D–Manorhaven).

Federal representation

United States Congress 
Flower Hill is located entirely within New York's 3rd Congressional district, which as of January 2023 is represented by George A. Santos (R).

United States Senate 
As with the rest of New York, Flower Hill is represented in the United States Senate by Kirsten E. Gillibrand (D) and Charles E. Schumer (D).

Politics 

Flower Hill contains four election districts which are located wholly within the village. All of these districts are located within New York's 16th assembly district (AD16):
AD 16 – ED 059
 AD 16 – ED 060
 AD 16 – ED 061
 AD 16 – ED 062
Additionally, the North Hempstead Country Club and one residence are located within AD16 – ED055. This district is shared between parts of unincorporated Port Washington and this part of Flower Hill, and like the other four election districts in Flower Hill, it is also located within New York's 16th assembly district.

In the 2016 U.S. presidential election, the majority of Flower Hill's voters voted for Hillary Clinton (D).

Parks and recreation 

 Flower Hill Village Park – A village-owned park, featuring with walking trails, a stage, a sports wall, and a playground, among other amenities.
North Hempstead Country Club – A private country club, located in the Port Washington section of the village.
Elderfields Preserve – A historic farm, museum, and nature preserve located in the Manhasset section of the village; it is owned by Nassau County.
Flower Hill also features and maintains several smaller park strips throughout the village, in addition to a network of walking tours pertaining to the history of the village.

Park district 
The portion of Flower Hill zoned for the Manhasset Union Free School District is located within the boundaries of (and is thus served by) the Manhasset Park District. This special district owns and operates numerous parks and parking facilities throughout the Greater Manhasset area.

Education

Schools

Public school districts 

The Incorporated Village of Flower Hill is located within the boundaries of (and is thus served by) the Manhasset Union Free School District, the Port Washington Union Free School District, and the Roslyn Union Free School District. As such, children who reside within Flower Hill attend public school go to school in one of these three districts, depending on where they reside within the village.

Additionally, the Roslyn Union Free School District's former Roslyn–Flower Hill Elementary School was located within the section of the village zoned for Roslyn's schools.

Private education 
The Village of Flower Hill is also home to the Vincent Smith School. This private school is located off of Port Washington Boulevard and serves students in grades one through twelve.

Library districts 
Flower Hill is served by three library districts, which correspond with the school district boundaries:

 The Bryant Library (Roslyn) – Serves the section of the village zoned for the Roslyn UFSD, through the Bryant Library.
 The Manhasset Library District – Serves the section of the village zoned for the Manhasset UFSD, through the Manhasset Library.
 The Port Washington Library District – Serves the section of the village zoned for the Port Washington UFSD, through the Port Washington Library.

All three libraries are members of the Nassau Library System.

Media

Newspapers 
The Incorporated Village of Flower Hill has three newspapers of record: The Manhasset Press, The Port Washington News, and The Roslyn News. All three of these papers are owned by Anton Media Group.

Other major newspapers serving Flower Hill include Newsday, New York Post, The New York Times, and The Wall Street Journal.

Television 
Flower Hill is one of North Shore TV's fourteen member villages. North Shore TV provides Flower Hill and the other member villages with public-access television programming, through Altice USA and Verizon Fios – the main cable television providers in the area.

Infrastructure

Transportation

Road 
Two state-owned roads pass through and serve the village:

  Northern Boulevard (NY 25A) – Forms portions of the southern border of the village, with Roslyn and Roslyn Estates.
  Port Washington Boulevard (NY 101) – Forms a portion of the Flower Hill – Munsey Park border, in addition to forming a portion of the Flower Hill – Port Washington border.
Other major roads which are located within (or pass through) the Village of Flower Hill include Bridge Road, Manhasset Woods Road, Middle Neck Road, Mineola Avenue, Old Northern Boulevard, Stonytown Road, and West Shore Road.

Additionally, the western end of the William Cullen Bryant Viaduct, which carries NY 25A over Hempstead Harbor and the Village of Roslyn, is located in Flower Hill.

Rail 
While there are no Long Island Rail Road stations located within the village limits, the Port Washington Branch does form portions of the Manhasset-Flower Hill and Plandome Manor-Flower Hill borders.

The nearest stations to the village are Manhasset, Plandome, and Port Washington on the Port Washington Branch, as well as the Roslyn station on the Oyster Bay Branch.

Bus 
Flower Hill is served by the n20H, n21, and n23 bus routes, which are operated by Nassau Inter-County Express (NICE). These three bus routes travel through the area via Northern Boulevard and Old Northern Boulevard, along the southern border of Flower Hill. The n23 also travels along Port Washington Boulevard, through the heart of the village.

Additionally, NICE's Port Washington Shuttle (connecting the downtown areas of Port Washington and Roslyn, as well as the Port Washington LIRR station) traverses West Shore Road on the southeastern edge of Flower Hill between the two communities – though it makes no stops within village limits.

Historic trolley line 
Between the 1900s and the 1920s, the Port Washington Line of the New York and North Shore Traction Company, ran between Mineola and Port Washington, via. Roslyn. This trolley line crossed through the village, utilizing Northern Boulevard, Middle Neck Road, and Port Washington Boulevard.

Additionally, the North Shore Line of the New York and North Shore Traction Company trolley line ran from Flushing to Roslyn, and connected with the Port Washington Line at the intersection of Middle Neck Road and Northern Boulevard.

Furthermore, a New York and North Shore trolley yard, known as the Roslyn Trolley Yard, existed at the northwestern corner of Northern Boulevard and Middle Neck Road.

Utility services

Natural gas 
National Grid provides natural gas to homes and businesses that are hooked up to natural gas lines in the Village of Flower Hill.

Power 
PSEG Long Island provides power to all homes and businesses within the Village of Flower Hill.

Sewage 
Most places in Flower Hill are not connected to a sanitary sewer system – although there were failed plans in the 1970s to create a sewer district for much of northwestern Nassau County, which would have included Flower Hill in the second phase of the $122 million (1972 USD) project. As such, the majority of homes and businesses in Flower Hill rely on cesspools and septic systems.

However, some portions of Flower Hill are connected to the sanitary sewers operated by the Port Washington Water Pollution Control District.

Trash collection 
Trash collection services in Flower Hill are provided by Dejana Industries, under contract with the Village of Flower Hill.

Water 
The Village of Flower Hill is served by three water districts, which roughly correspond with the school district boundaries:

 The Manhasset–Lakeville Water District – Serves the section of Flower Hill zoned for the Manhasset UFSD.
 The Port Washington Water District – Serves the section of Flower Hill zoned for the Port Washington UFSD.
 The Roslyn Water District – Serves the section of Flower Hill zoned for the Roslyn UFSD.

Healthcare and emergency services

Healthcare 
Flower Hill is home to St. Francis Hospital, located on Port Washington Boulevard, at its intersection with Middle Neck Road. St. Francis Hospital is regarded as one of the top heart care centers in the United States and is the only specialty designated cardiac center located within the State of New York. It is operated by Catholic Health Services of Long Island.

Additionally, a GoHealth urgent care center is located in the Roslyn section of the village, on Northern Boulevard (NY 25A). This walk-in clinic is operated by Northwell Health.

Fire 
The Village of Flower Hill is served by three fire districts:

 The Manhasset–Lakeville Fire District – Serves the Manhasset section of Flower Hill.
 The Port Washington Fire District – Serves the Port Washington section of Flower Hill.
 The Roslyn Fire District – Serves the Roslyn section of Flower Hill.

Police 
The Village of Flower Hill is served by the Nassau County Police Department's 6th Precinct, with RMPs 607, 610, and 619 assigned as the patrol cars for the village.

Landmarks 

 The Flower Hill Cemetery – A historic cemetery located in the village. It is also known as the "Burtis Cemetery" and the "Old Cemetery at Flower Hill".
 The George Washington Denton House – Located on West Shore Road, this property was listed on the National Register of Historic Places in 1985.
The Landmark Diner – A diner located in the Roslyn section of Flower Hill. The new building made the Landmark Diner the first prefabricated double-decker diner in the United States. The original, one-floor diner was replaced with a furniture store.
 The Sands-Willets Homestead – One of the original farm houses to still be standing within Flower Hill. This building is now home to the Cow Neck Peninsula Historical Society, and is designated as a Village of Flower Hill Historic Landmark, a New York State Landmark, and is listed on the National Register of Historic Places.
The Hewlett-Munson-Williams House – Another original, surviving farm house located within the village. This home is now part of Nassau County's 4-acre (1.6 ha) Elderfields Preserve, and is home to the Art Guild.

Notable people 
Vincent R. Balletta, Jr. – Former Republican New York State Assemblyman.
Mimi Benzell – Actress and singer for Broadway and the Metropolitan Opera. Benzell lived at 45 Cardinal Road, and was married to Walter Gould, the brother of American composer Morton Gould.
 Emil V. Cianciulli – Businessman, lawyer, Korean War veteran, and the former chairman of the Hofstra University Board of Trustees.
Perry Como – Singer. Como moved to Flower Hill in 1946.
Carson Daly – NBC television and radio personality, as well as a talk show host.
Daniel Dorff – Classical American composer; grew up on Crabtree Lane.
Manoug Exerjian – Architect; Exerjian was born in the Ottoman Empire and immigrated to the United States in 1923. He designed North Shore University Hospital in nearby Manhasset, and lived at 18 Bonnie Heights Road. 
 Mike Francesca – Sports radio host.
Frank Genese – Architect and Village Trustee.
Edmond Guggenheim – Businessman and philanthropist. Member of the Guggenheim family.
John Randolph Hearst – Business executive and the son of William Randolph Hearst.
Benjamin Heller – Lawyer known for participating in the creation of the New York City Code of Ethics. Served as the Mayor of Flower Hill between 1963 and 1970. He lived at 166 Hemlock Road.
 Milton Hopkins – Biology professor and author. Hopkins was the husband of Elizabeth Hewlett Hopkins of the Hewlett family, and they resided in the Hewlett Homestead. 
Victor W. Kliesrath – Former vice president of the Bendix Corporation; co-inventor of the Bragg-Kliesrath Brake.
Kenneth G. Langone – Founder, The Home Depot. Formerly lived on Elderfields Road.
William John Logan – Banker and college football player. Served as the Mayor of Flower Hill between 1931 and 1937.
Liebert Lombardo – Musician; Guy Lombardo's younger brother.
Robert Manning – Journalist.
 James F. McCann – Businessman; founder of 1-800 Flowers.
Christopher Mullin – Former NBA basketball player.
Patrice Munsel – American opera singer; Munsel was the youngest singer to ever star at the Metropolitan Opera, at the age of 17.
 Carlos W. Munson – President of the Munson Steamship Company. Munson was the founding father of Flower Hill. 
Nelson Olmsted – Actor; Olmsted once lived at 243 Mason Drive.
Norman F. Penny – Banker, insurance broker, and politician who had served in the New York State Assembly from 1938 to 1942; major Republican figure in Nassau County. Lived at 6 Knolls Lane.
 Elaine Phillips – Served as Mayor of Flower Hill from 2012 until 2016, when she was elected to the New York State Senate on November 8, 2016.
Ralph Pulitzer, Jr. – Son of publisher Ralph Pulitzer; lived at 191 Elderfields Road in the Manhasset section of Flower Hill.
Jesse J. Ricks – Former board chairman of Union Carbide; his estate, Chanticlare, was subdivided in the 1960s and became the Chanticlare at Flower Hill subdivision.
Robert C. Schuler – Advertising and public relations executive; Patrice Munsel's husband.
 Walter Slezak – Austrian actor; lived in Flower Hill until his death.
 Michael J. Tully Jr. – Former lawyer and politician; Tully served as the Town of North Hempstead Supervisor and as a New York State Senator. He died of a heart attack in his home in Flower Hill in 1997.
Charles F. Vachris – Civil engineer and founder of Vachris Engineering. Vachris served in various roles in Flower Hill's government, such as Village Trustee and Village Engineer.
Elizabeth Trump Walter – The sister of Fred Trump, the mother of John Walter, and President Donald J. Trump's aunt. She resided at 511 Manhasset Woods Road.
 John W. Walter – Mayor of Flower Hill between 1988 and 1996, and following that, the Village Historian until his death in 2018. Walter was the first cousin of President Donald J. Trump.
 Burl S. Watson – President and CEO of Cities Service Company.
Bagley Wright – Real estate developer and philanthropist, notable for being a developer of the Space Needle in Seattle. Wright and his family moved to an Aspinwall & Simpson-designed home on Elderfields Road around 1940.

Women's Club of Flower Hill 

The Women's Club of Flower Hill is a local philanthropic and social organization that was founded in 1949. Their key mission is to raise funds for charities, as well as to give back to the village. Notable examples of things that the organization has done include the reconstruction and landscaping of traffic islands in the village, installing a bicycle rack at the Flower Hill Village Park, along with donations to various children's charities.

Additionally, the Women's Club of Flower Hill holds a luncheon every year during the holiday season.

Light the Night 
Every holiday season, the Women's Club of Flower Hill, the Munsey Park Women's Club, the Plandome Association, and the Plandome Heights Women's Club throw a special fundraising event called Light the Night. This event illuminates the streets of Flower Hill, Plandome, Plandome Heights, and Munsey Park with white, bagged candles lining the roadways at night.

The proceeds from the candle/bag sales go to community beautification and support funds, as well as to charities.

In popular culture 
Over the years, scenes for several movies and television shows have been filmed in the Village of Flower Hill, including scenes for A Stranger Is Watching, Boardwalk Empire, Too Big to Fail, and Billions. Additionally, scenes for a David Chase movie were filmed in a home on Bonnie Heights Road, and TruTV shot a show on tag sales in Flower Hill.

See also 

 List of Tree Cities USA
List of villages in New York

References

External links
 Official website

 
Town of North Hempstead, New York
Villages in New York (state)
Villages in Nassau County, New York
Populated coastal places in New York (state)